Clop or Clops may refer to:

 An onomatopoeia for the sound of a horse's footsteps
 Clop (erotic fan art), a slang term for My Little Pony-themed pornography
 Clop (hat), a traditional hat in Maramureş, Romania
 CLOP, a 2012 computer game  made by Bennett Foddy
Iris Clops, fictional character in the Mattel fashion doll franchise Monster High

See also 
 Klop (disambiguation)
 Klopp (disambiguation)